Daniel Thomas Hawkins (born 22 April 2001) is a Welsh professional footballer who plays as a forward for Haverfordwest County.

Club career
Born in Cardiff, Hawkins spent time with Swansea City and Hull City before signing for Salford City. He spent loan spells at Marine and Stafford Rangers during the 2019–20 season.

He made his senior debut for Salford on 9 September 2020, in the EFL Trophy. At the end of the 2020–21 season, it was announced that he would be leaving the club.

In July 2021 he signed for League of Ireland Premier Division club Finn Harps. He left the club at the end of the season after 11 league appearances and 1 goal.

Hawkins signed for newly promoted club Shelbourne ahead of the 2022 season.

In March 2023 he returned to Wales, signing with Haverfordwest County.

International career
Hawkins is a Wales youth international.

Honours
Salford City
EFL Trophy: 2019–20

References

2001 births
Living people
Welsh footballers
Wales youth international footballers
Swansea City A.F.C. players
Hull City A.F.C. players
Salford City F.C. players
Marine F.C. players
Stafford Rangers F.C. players
Finn Harps F.C. players
Shelbourne F.C. players
Haverfordwest County A.F.C. players
Northern Premier League players
League of Ireland players
Association football forwards
Welsh expatriate footballers
Welsh expatriate sportspeople in Ireland
Expatriate association footballers in the Republic of Ireland
Cymru Premier players